Basset Brook is a stream formed at a shallow pond located approximately 1.4 miles northwest of Warrenville, Connecticut, United States,. The brook flows south and east from this pond and eventually to its mouth at the Mount Hope River, with a length of approximately 1.4 miles.

Course
Basset Brook flows south from its source pond, passing under Perry Hill Road.  It then flows southeast, through an area of wetlands.  After exiting these wetlands, the brook flows north, back under Perry Hill Road.  Basset Brook then turns to the east and flows through a small valley, and under Laurel Lane.  The brook flows through a series of rapids, passing under Connecticut Route 89, and then terminates at a farm, where it flows into the Mount Hope River. The majority of Basset Brook runs parallel to Perry Hill Road in Ashford, Connecticut.

Pollution
Basset Brook flows through a farm containing many free cattle.  Fecal waste has been known to flow into the brook during rainstorms, causing bacterial contamination in the brook's waters and also in the waters of the Mount Hope River.  A fence has been built along the brook in the farm to keep cattle away, and the stream banks have been stabilized with riparian vegetation.  Runoff from lawns and roads can also contaminate the brook.

See also
List of rivers of Connecticut

References

Rivers of Windham County, Connecticut
Rivers of Connecticut
Tributaries of the Thames River (Connecticut)